Zygodon viridissimus is a species of moss belonging to the family Orthotrichaceae.

It has almost cosmopolitan distribution.

References

Orthotrichales